Poykayil Yohannan (17 February 1879, in Eraviperoor – 1939), known as Poykayil Appachan or Poykayil Kumara Guru Devan, was a dalit activist, poet and the founder of the socio-religious movement Prathyaksha Raksha Daiva Sabha ("God's Society of Obvious Salvation"). His father was Kandan and mother Lachi. His original name was Kumaran.

Religious work
Yohannan joined the Marthoma church, a reformist sect among the Syrian Christians, but realised the church treated Dalits as an inferior class, and so left it. He then joined a new sect called the Brethren Mission where he faced similar instances of caste based discrimination. Johannan concluded that Indian Christian communities continued to discriminate based on caste, and felt this defied the basic tenets of Christianity.

In 1909, Yohannan left Christianity and started his own religious protest movement named Prathyaksha Raksha Daiva Sabha. He was known as Poikayil Appachan or Kumara Gurudevan afterwards. Johannan advocated spiritual liberation, and sought to empower and consolidate the Dalits, promoting a creed in which the "dalit castes" would be free of discrimination.

He was the first person to start an English medium school for the dalit community.

Work as a legislator
Yohannan was also a member of the Dalit advocacy group Sadhujana Paripalana Sangham which was founded in 1907 by another dalit leader of Kerala, Ayyankali. Yohannan was also twice nominated, in 1921 and 1931, to the Sree Moolam Praja Sabha, the legislative council of the princely state of Travancore.

Publications
 Unknown Subjects: Songs of Poykayil Appachan. Translated from Malayalam by A.S. Sekher
 Vadyakhoshangal Nadathunnavarum and Ente Vamshathepatti were featured in the Dalit Poem Collection named Kathal — published by DC Books

Media representations
 Mannikkale Maanikkyam - Drama by V. V. Santhakumar features Yohannan

References

Further reading

V. V. Swamy and E. V. Anil, "Prathyaksha Raksha Daiva Sabha - Orma, Pattu, Charithrarekhakal", Adiyardeepam Publications, 2010

'Vyavastayude Nadapathakal', Society of PRDS Studies, Unseen letters, Slate Publications, 2017

Dalit activists
Dalit writers
People from Pathanamthitta district
1879 births
1939 deaths
Liberation theologians
Converts to Christianity
Dalit religious leaders
Members of the Sree Moolam Popular Assembly
Activists from Kerala
19th-century Indian poets
20th-century Indian poets
Poets from Kerala
Indian former Christians